Tati Errecalde is a former Argentinian footballer who played in the National Professional Soccer League, Canadian Professional Soccer League, and the Major Indoor Soccer League.

Playing career 
Errecalde began his professional career in 1996 with the Detroit Rockers of the National Professional Soccer League. In his first season with Detroit he appeared in 27 matches and recorded six goals. Midway through the season he was traded to the Toronto Shooting Stars, where he played in three matches and scored one goal. In 1997, he returned to Detroit and featured in a total of 64 matches, and recorded 15 goals. In 2004, he signed with newly formed Windsor Border Stars of the Canadian Professional Soccer League. In his first season in the CPSL he finished as the club's leading goal scorer with ten goals, and helped the club secure a postseason berth by finishing third in the Western Conference. In the playoffs Windsor faced Toronto Croatia, but were eliminated from the competition after losing the match by a score of 5–0.  He made history in the Open Canada Cup tournament by scoring the equalizing goal in the cup final against Ottawa St. Anthony Italia, where Windsor claimed the title after settling  the 1–1 draw with a 4–2 victory in a penalty shootout. The following season he helped Windsor defend their second Open Canada Cup, and claim the AISL Championship. In 2005, during the indoor winter season he signed with the St. Louis Steamers of the Major Indoor Soccer League. During his tenure with St. Louis he won the regular season championship, but were defeated in the playoff finals to Baltimore Blast.

References 

Living people
Argentine footballers
Argentine expatriate footballers
Expatriate soccer players in the United States
Expatriate soccer players in Canada
Argentine expatriate sportspeople in Canada
Argentine expatriate sportspeople in the United States
Detroit Rockers players
Toronto Shooting Stars players
Windsor City FC players
St. Louis Steamers (2003–2006 MISL) players
National Professional Soccer League (1984–2001) players
Canadian Soccer League (1998–present) players
Major Indoor Soccer League (2001–2008) players
Association football midfielders
Year of birth missing (living people)
People from Tandil
Sportspeople from Buenos Aires Province